Microblepsis prunicolor is a moth in the family Drepanidae. It was described by Frederic Moore in 1888. It is found in north-eastern India, Sikkim, north-eastern Myanmar and possibly China.

The wingspan is about 36 mm. Adults are dark purplish grey, the forewings with an acutely angled yellowish antemedial line and a similar postmedial line met at the angle by a yellow line from the apex. There is also a pale submarginal line. The hindwings have slightly curved subbasal, medial, and submarginal yellowish lines.

References

Moths described in 1888
Drepaninae